Between 1947 and 1991, during the years of the Cold War, a large number of military awards and decorations were created by various nations to recognize the undeclared hostilities of the era.  Military medals of the Vietnam War and the Korean War are the best known due to the extreme level of the conflicts.

The following is a list of military decorations of the Cold War based on the various time periods and specific nations involved.

Americas

Canada
 Korea Medal
 Canadian Volunteer Service Medal for Korea
 Special Service Medal

Cuba

United States
Federal Service Medals
 Armed Forces Expeditionary Medal
 Korea Defense Service Medal
 Korean Service Medal
 Medal for Humane Action
 National Defense Service Medal
 Vietnam Service Medal
Unofficial
 Cold War Victory Medal The Cold War Victory Medal is both an official medal of the U.S. National Guard and an unofficial military medal of the United States. It is awarded by the U.S. states of Louisiana and Texas, and in ribbon form only by the State of Alaska.

Asia

Republic of China
Awards and decorations of China

North Vietnam
 Ho Chi Minh Order
Defeat American Aggression Badge
Vietnam Liberation Order

South Vietnam

North Korea
Awards and decorations of North Korea

Republic of Korea (South Korea)
 South Korean Presidential Unit Citation
 Korean War Service Medal
Order of National Security Merit
 Tong-il Medal
 Gugseon Medal
 Cheon-Su Medal
 Sam-il Medal
 Gwangbog Medal
Order of Military Merit
 Taeguk Cordon Medal
 Eulji Cordon Medal
 Chungmu Cordon Medal
 Hwarang Cordon Medal
 Inheon Cordon Medal

Europe

East Germany
Orders, decorations, and medals of East Germany

West Germany
Order of Merit
 Sonderstufe des Großkreuzes (Grand Cross special class)
 Großkreuz (Grand Cross 1st class, special design)
 Großkreuz (Grand Cross 1st class)
 Großes Verdienstkreuz mit Stern und Schulterband (Grand Cross with Star and Sash)
International equivalent: Großkreuz 2. Klasse (Grand Cross of Merit, Second class) or Großkomturkreuz (Grand Commander's Cross)
 Großes Verdienstkreuz mit Stern (Knight Commander's Cross or Grand Cross with Star)
 Großes Verdienstkreuz (Halskreuz) (Commander's Cross or Grand Cross (Neck cross))
 Verdienstkreuz 1. Klasse (Officer's Cross)
 Verdienstkreuz am Bande (Cross) International equivalent: Ritterkreuz (Knight's Cross)
 Verdienstmedaille (Medal)

The President of the Federal Republic holds the Sonderstufe des Großkreuzes ex officio. It is awarded to him in a ceremony by the President of the Bundestag attended by the Chancellor, the President of the Bundesrat and the Supreme Court President. Other than the President of the Federal Republic, only a foreign head of state can be awarded with the highest class. There is also the provision of awarding the Großkreuz in a special rare design, in which the central medallion with the black eagle is surrounded by a stylized laurel wreath in relief. which has so far only been used twice: for Konrad Adenauer and for Helmut Kohl.

Soviet Union
Orders, decorations, and medals of the Soviet Union

International Organizations

Inter-American Defense Board
 Inter-American Defense Board Medal

International Commission of Control and Supervision
 International Commission for Supervision and Control Medal; Indo-China, (1954–1974)
 International Commission of Control and Supervision Service Medal, Vietnam (1973)

United Nations
 United Nations Service Medal
 United Nations Medal

Military awards and decorations of the United States
Cold War